Steppin' Out is the second studio album by British girl group Cleopatra, released on 22 August 2000 by WEA in the majority of the world and Maverick Records in the United States.

Overview
Cleo Higgins served was the main songwriter on the album, which was also co-written by her bandmates. As well the album features production from Jimmy Jam and Terry Lewis, Dallas Austin and Stargate.

Recording and production
After the success of their debut Comin' Atcha! and gaining attention in the US, including a Top 40 entry for "Cleopatra's Theme", the girls entered the studio to start work on their then-untitled second album. The girls decided the direction of this album would be R&B and not pop like their first album. Cleo again was the main songwriter, having penned the entire first album with her sister and bandmates credited as co-writers.

Employing a variety of production teams including Cutfather & Joe, Jimmy Jam and Terry Lewis, Stargate and bass guitarist and background vocalist Debra Killings, the album was recorded across the US and UK as well as in Norway and Denmark.

Cover artwork
Photography duo Markus and Indrani, best known for their work with Mariah Carey and Beyoncé, were brought in to shoot the album artwork.

Reaction
Upon release, the album earned favourable reviews from critics. The lead single from the album, "Come and Get Me", reached No. 29 on the UK Singles Chart.

Track listing
 "Press Here to Start"
 "Come and Get Me"
 "U Got It"
 "Sweat Me"
 "Who's Your Woman"
 "Nobody Said"
 "Number One Fan"
 "Voo-Doo"
 "Yes, This Party's Going Right"
 "You Can't Be in My Life"
 "Bingo My Love"
 "Questions and Jealousy"
 "Take Me Now (Stop, Stop...)"

US version
 "Press Here to Start"
 "U Got It"
 "Take Me Now (Stop, Stop...)"
 "Sweat Me"
 "Nobody Said"
 "Come and Get Me"
 "Questions and Jealousy"
 "Who's Your Woman"
 "Bingo My Love"
 "Voo-Doo"
 "Yes, This Party's Going Right"

Bonus tracks
 "All Talk No Action" (Japanese release)

Credits

 Cleopatra Higgins: Lead vocals
 Zainam Higgins: Backing vocals
 Yonah Higgins: Backing vocals
 Christine Higgins: Backing vocals
 Jimmy Jam: Arranger, producer
 Terry Lewis: Arranger, producer
 Debra Killings: Producer
 Daryl Simmons: Keyboards, programming, producer, vocals (Background)
 Che Guevara: Producer
 Markus Klinko and Indrani: Photography
 Kenneth Hayes: Producer
 Xavier Smith: Assistant engineer
 Ivy Skoff: Production coordination
 Bradley Yost: Assistant engineer
 James Poyser: Producer
 Warren Riker: Mixing
 Kim Biggs: Package design
 Joe Belmaati Keyboards, programming

 Michael Norfleet: Keyboards, programming
 Andrea Wright: Engineer
 Lee Monteverde: Engineer
 Vernon Mungo: Assistant engineer
 Bradley Spalter: Keyboards, programming
 David Harlan: Package design
 Tue Roh: Fender Rhodes
 Stargate: Producer
 Amy Foster: Creative director
 Tim Scrafton: Producer
 Adam Kagan: Keyboards, engineer, programming
 John Horesco IV: Engineer, mixing
 Dorian Daniels: Bass, keyboards, programming
 Leslie Brathwaite: Mixing
 Rob Chiarelli: Mixing
 Steve Hodge: Engineer, mixing
 Kevin Lively: Assistant engineer

References

2000 albums
Cleopatra (band) albums
Albums produced by Dallas Austin
Albums produced by Jimmy Jam and Terry Lewis
Albums produced by Stargate